The Magic Position is the third studio album by English singer-songwriter Patrick Wolf. It was released on 26 February 2007. The album features collaborations with Marianne Faithfull and Edward Larrikin of Larrikin Love as well as backing vocals by Wolf's sister Jo Apps and also bass and alto clarinet instrumentation by Derek Apps. The album was preceded by the singles "Accident & Emergency" and "Bluebells".

Music critics and Wolf himself have noted that this album marks a departure from the musical style of his previous two albums, with this one being more pop-oriented. He cites Boney M and Giorgio Moroder as influences. Slant Magazine named The Magic Position the best album of 2007.

As of 2009 the album has sold 20,400 copies in United Kingdom.

Critical response
The Magic Position received general acclaim from music critics. At Metacritic, which assigns a normalised rating out of 100 to reviews from mainstream critics, the album received an average score of 82, based on 27 reviews, which indicates "universal acclaim".

Track listing
 "Overture" – 4:40
 "The Magic Position" – 3:53
 "Accident & Emergency" (featuring Edward Larrikin) – 3:17
 "The Bluebell" – 1:11
 "Bluebells" – 5:17
 "Magpie" (featuring Marianne Faithfull) – 3:57
 "X" – 1:05
 "Augustine" – 4:19
 "Secret Garden" – 1:49
 "Get Lost" – 3:17
 "Enchanted" – 2:07
 "The Stars" – 3:51
 "Finale" – 1:57

Digital download
 "The Marriage" – 2:46

UK enhanced edition
 "Bluebells" (music video)

Japanese edition
 "Underworld"
 "Adder"
 "Ari's Song" (Misprinted as "Ali's Song")
 "The Marriage"
 "Accident & Emergency" (music video)
 "The Magic Position" (music video)

Canadian edition
 "The Childcatcher" (live)
 "Luna & Libertine" (live)

Singles
 23 October 2006: "Accident & Emergency"
 1 January 2007: "Bluebells" (download-only)
 26 March 2007: "The Magic Position"
 2 July 2007: "Get Lost"

Personnel
 Patrick Wolf – lead vocals, Bosendorfer grand piano, Kawaii Modular synths, baritone & soprano ukuleles, mountain dulcimer, 5- and 15-string kanteles, clavichord, clavinet, programming, theremin, harmonium, autoharp, bells, gongs, handclaps, locks and keys
 Victoria Sutherland – solo violin
 Marianne Faithfull – vocals on "Magpie"
 Jo Apps – backing and sister vocal
 Derek Apps – bass and alto clarinets
 Katy Wright – solo cello
 Mark Rudland – trombones
 Flip Phillipp – vibraphone and glockenspiel
 Edward Larrikin – vocals on "Accident & Emergency"
 Richard Eigner – drums
 Werner Dafeldecker – double bass
 Jeremy Shaw, Richard Eigner, Patrick Pulsinger and Anna at Eastcote – handclaps
 Andreas Kaufmann – first violin
 Alexej Barer – second violin
 Raphael Handschuh – viola
 Rozaliya Rashkova – cello

Charts

References

2007 albums
Patrick Wolf albums